Since the establishment of the United Nations Mission in Kosovo (UNMIK) in 1999, it has been known to the international community that Kosovo is a major destination territory for human trafficking, women and young girls trafficked into forced prostitution. According to Amnesty International, most of women are trafficked from Moldova, Romania, Bulgaria and Ukraine.

In the 2010 Trafficking in Persons Report, Kosovo was identified as  transit and destination country for woman and children, victims of the human trafficking, especially the forced prostitution.

Origins of Demand

Human trafficking in Kosovo has seen "a steep rise" since NATO troops and UN administrators took over Kosovo. According to Amnesty International, NATO servicemen and UN staff "generate 80% of the income" for pimps and human traffickers. UN Department of peacekeeping claimed that "peacekeepers have come to be seen as part of the problem in trafficking rather than the solution". Amnesty found no evidence of criminal proceedings against NATO military personnel in their home countries.

Source countries

Amnesty International reports that, "Some 406 foreign women were assisted by the IOM in Kosovo between December 2000 and December 2003. According to the IOM, 48 per cent of women who have entered its repatriation program - enabling them to return to their home country - originated from Moldova. Of the remainder, 21 per cent came from Romania, 14 per cent from Ukraine, six per cent from Bulgaria, three per cent from Albania and the remainder from Russia and Serbia proper."

Reluctance of Kosovo administration

2010 Trafficking in Persons Report said "the Kosovo government did not follow the minimal measures to eliminate for the trafficking elimination". This regards to both forced prostitution, and forced begging.

Other 
Carla Del Ponte, the former chief U.N. war crimes prosecutor, claimed in her memoirs, that at least 300 ethnic Serbs were murdered and their organs stolen by the Kosovo Liberation Army during and after the Kosovo War in 1999. These claims were met with criticism in Albania and abroad.

In 2009, Serbian War Crimes Prosecutor Vladimir Vukčević claimed there was significant progress in investigation of the case of the yellow house, located in Northern Albania, where organs were harvested from kidnapped Serbs, non-Albanians from Kosovo, Czech and Russian citizens. Organs were later sold in the black market. The Albanian administration of Kosovo refused to cooperate with Serbian and international investigators on the case, but several arrests of medics practicing illegal surgery were made in Kosovo, allegedly in connection to the case.

In February 2011, the news website France 24 obtained classified documents showing that the UN had heard allegations in 2003 regarding the trafficking of human organs, with some named victims and testimonials from involved Albanians. A 2003 report about this matter describes the criminal involvement of senior commanders of the KLA.

See also 
Human trafficking in Europe
 Trafficking in human beings

References

External links 
 'Kosovo: Trafficked women and girls have human rights - Amnesty International
 Amnesty International - Kosovo: Facts and figures on trafficking of women and girls for forced prostitution in Kosovo
 'Nato force 'feeds Kosovo sex trade' - The Guardian
 'Balkans urged to curb trafficking - BBC
 Kosovo leglo prostitucije
 UN knowledge about human trafficking

Sex crimes
Crime in Kosovo by type
Human rights abuses in Kosovo